Marcus Faber (born 4 February 1984) is a German politician of the Free Democratic Party (FDP) who has been serving as a member of the Bundestag from the state of Saxony-Anhalt since 2017.

Early life and education
Faber attended the Rudolf-Hildebrand-Gymnasium in Stendal, where he graduated from high school in March 2003. Afterwards he did his basic military service as a tank pioneer in the Elb-Havel barracks in Havelberg. From 2003 to 2008, he studied political science at the University of Potsdam and Western Sydney University, graduating with a degree in political science.

Political career
In the 2017 federal elections, Faber ran for election in the Altmark constituency and was elected to the German Bundestag via the FDP state list. In parliament, he has since been a member of the Defense Committee. From 2021 to 2022, he briefly served as his parliamentary group’s spokesperson for defense policy.

Other activities
 German-Israeli Society, Member of the Board (2017-2019), Vice-Chairman (since 2019) 
 German-Taiwanese Association, Vice-Chairman (2019-2022), Chairman (since 2022)

References

External links 

  
 Bundestag biography 

1984 births
Living people
Members of the Bundestag for Saxony-Anhalt
Members of the Bundestag 2017–2021
Members of the Bundestag 2021–2025
Members of the Bundestag for the Free Democratic Party (Germany)